Kongsberg Mesotech Ltd, based in Port Coquitlam, BC, Canada, is informally  operated by Kongsberg Gruppen. Website Proff.no does not include the company on the lists of subsidiaries of Kongsberg Gruppen  or  Kongsberg Maritime.

Mesotech make underwater surveillance and advanced frogman detection sonar systems.

The company was formed in 1973 to design and manufacture underwater acoustic equipment. Today Kongsberg Mesotech Ltd. supplies a worldwide customer base with a range of products for military, fisheries, oilfield, scientific, and other offshore market applications.

Product range 
Kongsberg Mesotech's Vancouver office is responsible for the design, manufacture and sales of underwater acoustic products, including:
 Imaging and profiling mechanically scanned sonars 
 Multibeam imaging sonars 
 Multibeam profiling sonar 
 Multibeam diver detection sonar 
 Altimeters

Kongsberg Mesotech makes over 100 models of multibeam, scanning, side scan, echo sounder, and altimeter sonar combinations.

Scanning sonar 
Kongsberg Mesotech's breakthrough came in 1982 with the development of the Model 971 Scanning Sonar. This high resolution scanning sonar was quickly accepted by military and offshore oilfield market users, and soon became a standard for all ROV operations. In 1984 Mesotech was awarded the "Special Meritorious Award for Engineering Innovation" for the 971 Sonar by Petroleum Engineering International, and Pipeline & Gas Journal magazines.

Multibeam sonar 
In 1997, the Kongsberg Mesotech introduced the SM 2000 Multibeam Sonar, the FS 925 Forward Scanning Trawl Sonar and the MS 900D Digital Telemetry Mechanically Scanned Sonar Processor. In 1999 the PC-based MS 1000 Scanning Sonar Processor, and the 1071-series of scanning sonar heads and altimeters were added to the suite of Kongsberg Mesotech equipment.

See also

References

External links
 Kongsberg Maritime web site
 Kongsberg Mesotech information at Kongsberg Maritime web site
 Kongsberg Mesotech information at www.naval-technology.com
 White paper on new trends in diver detection systems (released April 2009)

Diving engineering
Manufacturing companies of Canada
Underwater security
Canadian companies established in 1973
Diver-detector sonars
Mesotech